A performance car is a car that exhibits above-average capabilities in one or more of the following areas: acceleration, top speed, cornering and braking. It is debated how much performance is required to move classification from standard to high performance.

Classification
Further classification of performance cars is possible in the following categories:
 Grand tourer — a luxury performance car designed for high speed and long-distance driving
 Hot hatch — a high-performance version of mass-produced hatchback model
 Muscle car — a large American rear-wheel drive car with a V8 engine
 Sports sedan — a high-performance version of a sedan model
 Supercar — an expensive high-end sports car, with hypercars being the most expensive and fastest supercars.

Gallery

See also 
 Performance Car (magazine)

Automotive terminology